(re)Production is the twenty-third solo album by rock musician Todd Rundgren that was recorded and released in 2011. For this album, Rundgren re-recorded songs that he had produced for other bands across his career, including Meat Loaf, Hall & Oates, The Tubes and Grand Funk Railroad.  (re)Production gives these songs a much more modern sheen, incorporating elements of electronic dance music and synthpop. The work was created during the MyRecordFantasy Camp sessions at the Track Shack in January 2011 arranged by the label Gigatone Records. Album packaging includes samples of cover art submissions by fans. Alternate covers were used for International, Domestic, and online versions.

Track listing
 "Prime Time" (Spooner, Waybill, Cotten, Prince, Styles, Anderson, Steen, Welnick) – originally performed by The Tubes – 3:29 
 "Dancing Barefoot" (Kral, Smith) – originally performed by Patti Smith – 3:56 
 "Two Out of Three Ain't Bad" (Steinmann) – originally performed by Meat Loaf – 3:21 
 "Chasing Your Ghost" (Johannes) – originally performed by What Is This? – 3:29 
 "Love My Way" (Ashton, R. Butler, T. Butler, Ely) – originally performed by Psychedelic Furs – 4:31 
 "Personality Crisis" (Johansen, Thunders) – originally performed by New York Dolls – 3:53 
 "Is It a Star?" (Hall, Oates) – originally performed by Hall & Oates – 3:38
 "Tell Me Your Dreams" (Eaton) – originally performed by Jill Sobule – 3:50
 "Take It All" (Ham) – originally performed by Badfinger – 4:08
 "I Can't Take It" (Zander) – originally performed by Cheap Trick – 3:11
 "Dear God" (Partridge) – originally performed by XTC – 3:59
 "Out of My Mind" (Bourgeois) – originally performed by Bourgeois Tagg – 3:27
 "Everything" (Cocharane) – originally performed by Rick Derringer – 4:25
 "Walk Like a Man" (Crewe, Gaudio, Brewer, Farner) – originally performed by Grand Funk Railroad – 3:36
 "Nothing to Lose" (Pigott, Hunter) – originally performed by Hunter aka Dragon – 3:05

Personnel
Todd Rundgren – vocals and various instruments, engineer, mixing
Daniel Iasbeck – guitar
Mary Ellen Manning – guitar
Bruce Whetstone – bass
Tim Longfellow – organ
Don Slovin – tin whistle
Sam LaMonica – drums
Various guests – backing vocals

References

Todd Rundgren albums
2011 albums
Albums produced by Todd Rundgren